Action – Italia Viva (A–IV), informally known as the Third Pole, is a liberal and centrist parliamentary group and electoral list which ran in the 2022 Italian general election. The list is led by Carlo Calenda. During the 19th legislature, it named its parliamentary group Action – Italia Viva – Renew Europe in the Chamber and the Senate.

History 
Following the resignation of Mario Draghi as Prime Minister of Italy and the call for a snap election, Carlo Calenda's Action (A) party signed on 2 August an alliance with Enrico Letta's Democratic Party (PD), the head of the centre-left coalition. On 6 August, the PD signed another pact with the Greens and Left Alliance (AVS), formed by Green Europe (EV) and Italian Left (SI), which had never supported Draghi's government. This caused tensions between Letta and Calenda. The latter, being a strong supporter of economic liberalism and nuclear power, considered impossible a coalition between his own party and the left-wing AVS. On 7 August, Calenda broke the alliance with the PD. On 11 August, Matteo Renzi's Italia Viva (IV) and A signed an agreement to create a centrist alliance led by Calenda, using IV's symbol to avoid the requirement to collect signatures for Calenda's party. Early August polls speculated that the formation of the Third Pole would not be influential in single-member constituencies but could cost the centre-left coalition votes in some competitive districts.

Despite Draghi's dismissal, Calenda and Renzi said they would push for Draghi to remain as prime minister, should they win enough seats. They also ran a pro-nuclear power and pro-regasification campaign as solutions for the ongoing energy crisis. In the general election on 25 September, the Third Pole obtained 21 seats in the Chamber of Deputies and 9 seats in the Senate of the Republic, having polled about 8%. On 3 October, Calenda announced that the two parties would form a joint parliamentary group in the next parliament and start a federation between the two movements.

Composition

Main parties

Associate parties

Regional partners

Former partners

Electoral results

Italian Parliament

Regional Councils

See also 
 Electoral list
 For the Third Pole
 New Pole for Italy
 Pact for Italy
 Renew Europe
 Third Pole (Italy, 2006)
 With Monti for Italy

References 

2022 establishments in Italy
Centrist parties in Italy
Liberal parties in Italy
Political party alliances in Italy
Political parties established in 2022